Sun Valley Museum of Art is the oldest arts organization in central Idaho’s Wood River Valley. Founded in 1971, The Museum has grown from a few people presenting classes and events to an organization that has over 25,000 people attend events annually (in a valley with a population of 22,000). More than half of those who attended, attended free programs.

The Museum's main gallery and staff offices are in Ketchum, Idaho, but the SVMoA also operates a second location in Hailey, Idaho, to better serve the needs of the growing population of southern Blaine County. The Hailey location consists of a historic 100-year-old house that was the birthplace of the poet Ezra Pound and a newly built, state of the art freestanding classroom.

In 2006 the Sun Valley Museum of Art received accreditation status from the American Alliance of Museums in recognition of its adherence to the highest standards of operation and programming. Only five percent of America's arts and cultural institutions share this distinction. The Museum is a nonprofit, 501(c)(3) organization.

Multidisciplinary Programs 
The Sun Valley Museum of Art is nationally recognized for its unique multidisciplinary programming. The Museum's visual arts, performing arts and education and humanities directors work in tandem with the artistic director to develop three or four multidisciplinary projects a year that explore timely themes and topics from multiple perspectives. Recent topics include mining, the relationship between DNA and identity, biodiversity, Tibetan art and culture, corporate America and philanthropy, and Mexican immigration and labor. Concerts, visual arts exhibitions, lectures and classes are offered, all relating to the theme.

Exhibitions 
The Museum displays contemporary and historical art by artists from all around the world, some who are internationally known and others who are at early, promising stages of their careers. A partial list of artists whose work has been exhibited at SVMoA in recent years includes Sebastião Salgado, Marie Watt, Sheila Hicks, Martha Rosler, Julie Blackmon, Morris Graves, Joyce Kozloff, Emmet Gowin, and George Nakashima. The Museum organizes almost all of its exhibitions and has on occasion sent one of its exhibitions to other venues. The Museum's main exhibition space is in Ketchum, Idaho. A second exhibition space, devoted primarily to art with a regional connection, is operated in a historic home in Hailey, Idaho.

Lectures & Performing Arts 
The Museum's annual Lecture Series and Performance Series bring distinguished performers and provocative writers and thinkers to the Wood River Valley. The 2009–2010 Lecture Series lineup consists of humorist David Sedaris, Pulitzer Prize-winning author Junot Díaz, journalist Roxana Saberi, and former U.S. Health & Human Services Secretary Donna Shalala. Other notable persons hosted by the Sun Valley Museum of Art include E. O. Wilson, Gloria Steinem, Louise Erdrich, Michael Pollan, Michael Chabon, Henry Louis Gates, Mara Liasson, Scott Simon, Mary Oliver, Barbara Ehrenreich, Robert Thurman, Terry Tempest Williams, Geraldine Brooks, Rick Bass, and Maxine Hong Kingston.

Performing artists include Ragamala Dance, the Shanghai Quartet, Jake Shimabukuro, Perla Batalla, Martin Hayes, the African Children's Choir, Lura, BodyVox Dance, Ririe-Woodbury Dance, and the Vienna Choir Boys.

The Museum's outdoor summer concerts feature some of the most popular names in rock, country, and blues. Past performers include Lyle Lovett, Bonnie Raitt, Arlo Guthrie, Rosanne Cash, and Jonny Lang.

Educational Outreach 
The Museum works in partnership with other local nonprofit organizations and the Blaine County School District. Many performers, writers and artists who come to town to participate in Sun Valley Museum of Art's programs also visit local schools. Distinguished visitors in recent years include E. O. Wilson, Louise Erdrich, Gloria Steinem, Henry Louis Gates Jr., Michael Pollan, and Junot Díaz. In addition, the museum offers after-school art classes in both English and Spanish, either at area schools or at locations nearby, free of charge to elementary and middle-school students. The Museum offers a variety of scholarships to local students and teachers, paid for mostly out of proceeds from its only fundraising event, an annual Wine Auction.

Annual Wine Auction Fundraiser 
The Sun Valley Museum of Art depends on the Wine Auction, its only fundraiser, for more than half its operating budget. Many Museum programs are offered free of charge thanks in large part to the Wine Auction.

The Wine Auction, which celebrates its 29th year in 2010, is consistently ranked among the nation's Top 10 Charity Wine Auctions by Wine Spectator magazine. During the three-day Auction weekend in July, more than 3,000 people attend the myriad events, which range from a festive Wine Auction Gala to a dozen intimate Vintner Dinners at private homes. The largest events are a Wine Tasting Extravaganza and a Wine Picnic and Concert. In 2009 SVMoA introduced several new events, including a sold-out Riedel Wine Symposium and a series of events aimed at younger art lovers who are members of The Museum's Junior Patrons Circle. Guest chefs in 2009 included Rick Moonen, Cal Stamenov, Ben Spungin, and John Tesar.

Annual Arts & Crafts Festival 
An annual Arts & Crafts Festival held in August attracts thousands of visitors and features 130 booths of fine arts and crafts. The festival, a long-standing tradition in the Wood River Valley, celebrated its 41st year in 2009. Participation is highly competitive; fewer than 20% of the artists who apply are accepted. The three-day festival, held since 2007 in Atkinson Park, Ketchum, features live music and entertainment throughout the weekend, artist demonstrations, and activities for kids. Admission is free.

New Building 
The Museum is in the process of fundraising to build a  new building in Ketchum, designed by noted architect Tom Kundig of the Seattle-based firm Olson Sundberg Kundig Allen Architects. The new building will include flexible spaces for exhibitions and performances and will serve as a gathering place for the community. The Museum has registered the building for LEED certification.

References

External links 
 

Institutions accredited by the American Alliance of Museums
Arts centers in Idaho
Art museums and galleries in Idaho
Performing arts centers in Idaho
Buildings and structures in Blaine County, Idaho
Tourist attractions in Blaine County, Idaho